Westmorland was a federal electoral district in New Brunswick, Canada, that was represented in the House of Commons of Canada from 1867 to 1968.

It was created by the British North America Act of 1867, and was abolished in 1966 when it was redistributed into Westmorland—Kent and Moncton ridings.

It consisted of the County of Westmorland.

Members of Parliament

This riding elected the following Members of Parliament:

Election results

By-election: on Mr. Smith being appointed Minister of Marine and Fisheries:

|- 
  
|Liberal
| Albert James Smith
|align="right"| acclaimed

By-election: on Mr. Wood being called to the Senate:

|- 
  
|Liberal-Conservative
|Henry A. Powell  
|align="right"| acclaimed

By-election: on Mr. Emmerson being appointed Minister of Railways and Canals:

|- 
  
|Liberal
|Henry Emmerson
|align="right"|acclaimed

By-election: on Mr. Emmerson's death:

|- 
  
|Liberal
|Arthur Bliss Copp 
|align="right"|acclaimed

By-election: on Mr. Copp's appointment as Secretary of State of Canada:

|- 
  
|Liberal
|Arthur Bliss Copp 
|align="right"|acclaimed

By-election: on Mr. Rideout's death:

|- 
  
|Liberal
|Margaret Rideout
|align="right"|20,401 
|align="right"| 55.0
|align="right"| +6.9
  
|Progressive Conservative
|Edward Murphy
|align="right"|14,090
|align="right"| 38.0
|align="right"| -1.4
 
|New Democratic Party
|Henry Landry
|align="right"|2,615 
|align="right"| 7.0
|align="right"| -3.6

See also 

 List of Canadian federal electoral districts
 Past Canadian electoral districts

External links 
 Riding history from the Library of Parliament

Former federal electoral districts of New Brunswick